is Japanese chemical company, specializing in the development, manufacture and sale of inks, pigments, polymers, specialty plastics and compounds and biochemicals.

It was founded in 1908 as Kawamura Ink Manufactory, renamed to Kawamura Kijuro Shoten in 1915, incorporated as Dainippon Printing Ink Manufacturing in 1937 and renamed to Dainippon Ink and Chemicals (DIC) in 1962 before the name was changed to the present name DIC Corporation in 2008 on the occasion of its 100th anniversary. The company slogan "Color & Comfort By Chemistry" suggests that DIC products should deliver color and comfort to daily life.

The company operates worldwide (through 176 subsidiary and affiliate companies in 62 countries) and includes the Sun Chemical corporation, based in the Americas and Europe.

DIC in Japan has 10 plants in Japan, located in Tokyo, Chiba, Hokuriku, Sakai, Kashima, Yokkaichi, Shiga, Komaki, Saitama, and Tatebayashi. The main research laboratory in Japan is located in Sakura, Chiba cooperating with DIC development centers in China (Qingdao DIC Finechemicals Co., Ltd., Qingdao, China) and the Sun Chemical Group's research laboratories (in USA, Germany and UK).

The company is listed on the Tokyo Stock Exchange.

History
 1908 Founded as Kawamura Ink Manufactory
 1937 Incorporated Dainippon Printing Ink Manufacturing
 1950 Listed on the Tokyo Stock Exchange
 1962 Merged with Japan Reichhold, changed Company name to Dainippon Ink and Chemicals
 1986 Acquired Sun Chemical's Graphic Art Material Dept.
 1987 Acquired Reichhold Chemicals, Inc.
 1999 Acquired Totalfina S.A.’s Printing Ink Dept. (Coates)
 2005 Sold Reichhold
 2008 Changed Company name to DIC Corporation
 2009 Established DIC Graphics, joint venture with Dai Nippon Printing (DNP) integrating DIC's domestic printing ink business and DNP's printing ink business
 2021 Acquired BASF’s Global Pigments Business, known as BASF Colors & Effects (BCE)

Business and products

DIC is divided in 3 business units and 6 product divisions

Packaging & Graphic 
 Printing Material Products Division : Offset inks, gravure inks, flexo inks, metal decorative inks, security inks, printing plates, jet inks, news inks
 Packaging Material Products Division: Packaging adhesives, coextruded multilayer films, polysterene (hyperbranched, GPPS, HIPS).

Color & Display 
Color Material Products Division: pigments for printing inks, pigments for coatings and plastics, pigments for specialty applications, pigments for color filters, pigments for cosmetics and health foods (Spirulina)
 Display Material Products Division: Thin-Film transistor liquid crystal (TFT LC), Supertwisted nematic liquid crystal (STN LC)

Functional Product 
 Performance Material Products Division: general polymers (alkyd resins, unsaturated polyester resins, plasticizers, waterborne resins, acrylic resins, phenolic resins) specialty polymers (epoxy resins, ultraviolet (UV)-curable resins, polyurethane resins, fluorochemicals), metal carboxylates, sulphur chemicals, fiber and textile colorants
 Composite Material Products Division: polyphenylene sulfide (PPS) compounds, interior housing products, industrial adhesive tapes, plastic colorants, high-performance optical materials, Hollow-fiber membranes, medical diagnostics products

DIC Color System Guide 

The DIC Color System Guide is a spot color system, based on Munsell color theory. It is common in Japan, and comparable in role to the Pantone systems.

Cultural activities
DIC owns 47.7% of the sports club chain "Renaissance".
In 1990, the company established the Kawamura Memorial DIC Museum of Art to exhibit artwork collected by the company and its affiliates. The museum is located in a 30-hectare park near to its Central Research Laboratories.

Gallery

References

External links

Official website 
DIC Corporation, Corporate Profile
Yahoo! Finance -  DIC Corporation Company Profile
  Wiki collection of bibliographic works on DIC Corporation

Chemical companies based in Tokyo
Companies listed on the Tokyo Stock Exchange
Chemical companies established in 1908
Japanese companies established in 1908